The 19th Ward Meetinghouse and Relief Society Hall, at 168 W. 500 North, Salt Lake City, Utah, was listed on the National Register of Historic Places in 1976.

It was built in 1896. Its architecture is significant in American history as reflecting changes imposed upon the Church of Jesus Christ of Latter-day Saints (LDS Church) by outside influences. Pressure included various Federal enforcement efforts following upon the Edmunds–Tucker Act of 1877, which outlawed polygamy. In effect, the LDS Church capitulated, and sought to adopt different values in conformity with worldwide ones. The meetinghouse was designed by architect Robert Bowman and represented a "totally out of character" change in style; it includes an "oriental, Byzantine, or German Renaissance-inspired onion dome". It was no longer a church when listed on the National Register of Historic Places in 1976.

The building currently houses Salt Lake Acting Company.

References

Clubhouses on the National Register of Historic Places in Utah
Buildings and structures completed in 1890
Buildings and structures in Salt Lake City
19th-century Latter Day Saint church buildings
National Register of Historic Places in Salt Lake City
Relief Society buildings